Terebești is a commune of 1,647 inhabitants situated in Satu Mare County, Romania. It is composed of four villages: Aliza (Alizmajor), Gelu (Vadaspuszta), Pișcari (Piskáros) and Terebești.

References

Communes in Satu Mare County